Fred Fisher (born Alfred Breitenbach, September 30, 1875 – January 14, 1942) was a German-born American songwriter and Tin Pan Alley music publisher.

Biography
Fisher was born in Cologne, Germany. His parents were Max and Theodora Breitenbach. After visiting the United States in 1892, he immigrated in 1900, where he adopted the name Fred Fischer.  He founded the Fred Fischer Music Publishing Company in 1907. During World War I he changed his surname to Fisher to make it seem less Germanic.

In 1914, Fred Fisher married Ana Fisher ( Davidovitch, later anglicized as Davis; born 1896).  Their children – Daniel ("Danny"; 1920–2001), Marvin (1916–1993), and Doris (1915–2003) – also wrote songs professionally. Fisher died in Manhattan, New York, and was interred at Maimonides Cemetery in Brooklyn.

In 1970, Fred Fisher was inducted into the Songwriters Hall of Fame.  The Ripley's "Believe It or Not" column credited him with writing more Irish songs than anyone else.

Selected compositions
"If the Man in the Moon Were a Coon," by Fred Fischer, Will Rossiter (1867–1954) (pub) (1905)  (this was his first hit; it combined two then-popular song themes, Moon songs and Coon songs)
"Come Josephine In My Flying Machine," by Fred Fischer, Shapiro (pub) (1910) 
"Peg O' My Heart, words by Alfred Bryan, music by Fred Fisher, Leo Feist (pub) (1913) 
"Who paid the rent for Mrs. Rip Van Winkle?" words by Alfred Bryan, music by Fred Fischer, Leo Feist (pub) (1914) 
"Lorraine (My Beautiful Alsace Lorraine)" lyrics by Alfred Bryan, music by Fred Fisher, McCarthy & Fisher (pub) (1917)  
"They Go Wild, Simply Wild, Over Me," words by Joseph McCarthy (1885–1943), music by Fred Fisher, McCarthy & Fisher (pub) (1917) 
"The Popular Wobbly," parody of "They Go Wild, Simply Wild, Over Me," words by T-Bone Slim (1880–1942), Industrial Workers of the World (pub) (1920) 
"Dardanella," words by Fred Fisher, music by Felix Bernard (1897–1944) & Johnny S. Black (1895–1936), McCarthy & Fisher Inc. (1919) 
"Chicago," by Fred Fisher, Fred Fisher (pub) (1922) 
"That's When Your Heartaches Begin," by William Raskin, George Brown (Billy Hill), and Fred Fisher, Fred Fisher Music Co. (1940) (an Ink Spots tune recorded in 1957 by Elvis) 
"Your Feet's Too Big," by Ada Benson, Fred Fisher, The Four Ink Spots (1936) 
"I'd Rather Be Blue," words by Billy Rose, music by Fred Fisher, Irving Berlin (pub) (1928) 
"Whispering Grass," words by Fred Fisher, music by Doris Fisher, Mills Music Inc. (pub) (1940) 
Some of his other songs are;
 1917 "Pull the Cork Out of Erin Let the River Shannon Flow". L: Addison Burkhardt
 1918 "Come Across, Yankee Boy, Come Across". L: Alfred Bryan
 1918 "In the Harbor of My Mother's Arms". L: Monty Brice
 1918 "Little Blue Bonnet Girl"
 1918 "Mister McAdoo". L:Joseph McCarthy & Alfred Bryan
 1918 "Oui, Oui, Marie". L: Alfred Bryan
 1918 "Sink All Your Ships in the Ocean Blue". L: Jack Glogau
 1918 "Wee, Wee, Marie (Will You Do Zis for Me)". L: Joseph McCarthy & Alfred Bryan
 1918 "We're All Comrades Now". L: Joseph McCarthy
 1918 "When Yankee Doodle Sails Upon the Good Ship Home Sweet Home". L: Addison Burkhardt

Filmography 
 My Man (1928) – Fanny Brice sings I'd Rather Be Blue, a Fisher-Billy Rose collaboration that was later covered by Barbra Streisand.
 Oh, You Beautiful Doll (1949) – This film is a fictionalized Hollywood biography featuring many of Fisher's songs.  A Tin Pan Alley promoter (Mark Stevens) turns serious composer Fred Breitenbach (S.Z. Sakall) into songwriter Fred Fisher.

Gallery

References 
General references
Source Citation:

 American National Biography. 24 volumes. Edited by John A. Garraty and Mark C. Carnes. New York: Oxford University Press, 1999
 American Popular Songs. From the Revolutionary War to the present. Edited by David Ewen. New York: Random House, 1966
 American Songwriters. By David Ewen. New York: H.W. Wilson Co., 1987
 The ASCAP Biographical Dictionary. Third edition. New York: American Society of Composers, Authors and Publishers, 1966
 ASCAP Biographical Dictionary. Fourth edition. Compiled for the American Society of Composers, Authors and Publishers by Jaques Cattell Press. New York: R.R. Bowker, 1980
 Biographical Dictionary of American Music. By Charles Eugene Claghorn. West Nyack, NY: Parker Publishing Co., 1973
 Biography Index. A cumulative index to biographical material in books and magazines. Volume 1: January 1946 – July 1949. New York: H.W. Wilson Co., 1949
 Biography Index. A cumulative index to biographical material in books and magazines. Volume 6: September 1961 – August 1964. New York: H.W. Wilson Co., 1965
 Biography Index. A cumulative index to biographical material in books and magazines. Volume 15: September 1986 – August 1988. New York: H.W. Wilson Co., 1988
 Biography Index. A cumulative index to biographical material in books and magazines. Volume 16: September 1988 – August 1990. New York: H.W. Wilson Co., 1990
 The Complete Encyclopedia of Popular Music and Jazz, 1900–1950. Three volumes. By Roger D. Kinkle. New Rochelle, NY: Arlington House Publishers, 1974. Biographies are located in Volumes 2 and 3
 Dictionary of Pseudonyms. Third edition. By Adrian Room. Jefferson, NC: McFarland & Co., 1998
 The Encyclopedia of Popular Music. Third edition. Eight volumes. Edited by Colin Larkin. London: MUZE, 1998. Grove's Dictionaries, New York, 1998
 The Heritage Encyclopedia of Band Music. Composers and their music. Supplement. By William H. Rehrig. Westerville, OH: Integrity Press, 1996
 The New American Dictionary of Music. By Philip D. Morehead with Anne MacNeil. New York: Dutton, 1991
 The New Grove Dictionary of American Music. Four volumes. Edited by H. Wiley Hitchcock and Stanley Sadie. London: Macmillan Press, 1986
 Notable Names in the American Theatre. Clifton, NJ: James T. White & Co., 1976. Earlier edition published as The Biographical Encyclopaedia and Who's Who of the American Theatre
 The Oxford Companion to Popular Music. By Peter Gammond. Oxford, England: Oxford University Press, 1991
 Popular American Composers. From Revolutionary times to the present. A biographical and critical guide. First edition. Compiled and edited by David Ewen. New York: H.W. Wilson Co., 1962
 Songwriters. A biographical dictionary with discographies. By Nigel Harrison. Jefferson, NC: McFarland & Co., 1998
 Sweet and Lowdown. America's popular song writers. By Warren Craig. Metuchen, NJ: Scarecrow Press, 1978. Biographies appear in the 'After Tin Pan Alley' section, beginning on page 91
 Tin Pan Alley. An encyclopedia of the golden age of American song. By David A. Jasen. New York: Routledge, 2003

Inline citations

External links

 
 
 Fred Fisher recordings at the Discography of American Historical Recordings.
Fred Fisher at the Sheet Music Consortium 
Articles
Fred Fisher at AllMusic

Streaming audio
Fred Fisher on Victor Records

1875 births
1942 deaths
American male songwriters
Emigrants from the German Empire to the United States
19th-century German Jews
Jewish American songwriters
Music publishers (people)